Manu may refer to:

Geography
Manú Province, a province of Peru, in the Madre de Dios Region
Manú National Park, Peru
Manú River, in southeastern Peru
Manu River (Tripura), which originates in India and flows into Bangladesh
Manu Temple, a summit in the Grand Canyon, United States
Manu, Tripura, a village in Tripura, India
Manu, a village in Topliţa Commune, Hunedoara County, Romania
Manu, a village in Tâmna Commune, Mehedinţi County, Romania
Moku Manu, an island in the Hawaiian islands

People
Manu (name)
Manu (footballer, born 1973), Manuel Francisco Cantero Jerez, Spanish football goalkeeper
Manu (footballer born 1979), Antonio Manuel Sánchez Gómez, Spanish football midfielder
Manú (footballer) (born 1982), Emanuel Jesus Bonfim Evaristo, Portuguese football winger
Manu (footballer, born 1984), José Manuel Rodríguez Morgade, Swiss football left-back
Manu (footballer, born 2001), Manuel Jorge Silva, Portuguese football defensive midfielder for Vitória Guimarães

Religion

Proto Indo European Mythology 

 Manu (Indo European Mythology) one of the mythical duo Manu and Yemo

Ancient Mesopotamia
Manu the Great, a Chaldean god of fate

Hinduism
Manu (Hinduism), Hindu progenitor of mankind
 Vaivasvata Manu, the current Manu
Manusmṛti or Manu's code, an important early Hindu text
Manu Needhi Cholan, a legendary Chola Dynasty king

New Age
Manu (Theosophy), Ascended Master of 5th Race

Sports teams
Manu Samoa, the Samoa national rugby union team
F.C. Manu Laeva, a Tuvaluan football club
Manu Laeva (women), Tuvaluan women's football club
Manchester United F.C., an English football club

Other uses
 29353 Manu, a main-belt asteroid
 Manu (bird), a genus of prehistoric albatross-like birds from New Zealand
Manu (film), Telugu film
 Manu (River City), a character on a BBC Scotland soap opera
 Manu (TV series), a 1991 French animated television series
 Tangata manu, the winner of a traditional competition of Easter Island
 An alternate name for the Ornithological Society of Polynesia
 A character in the 2000 French adult film Baise-moi
 Canadian real estate slang for a modular home
 An Akan name given to a second born child
 A manu bomb, the New Zealand term for Cannonball (diving)

See also
 Manus (disambiguation)

Indian given names
Indian masculine given names
Hindu given names
Romanian-language surnames